The Moel-y-Parc transmitting station is situated on Moel y Parc, a hill in north-east Wales at the northern end of the Clwydian range, close to the town of Caerwys and several miles (kilometres) north-east of Denbigh. It was built in 1962/1963 by the IBA to bring 405-line VHF ITV television to North Wales and it has been on the air since 1963. In 1965, VHF television transmissions from the BBC commenced from the site.

Its official coverage area includes parts of Flintshire, Denbighshire and Wrexham (although the majority of Wrexham is in a blindspot of direct transmission from Moel-y-Parc, its analogue transmissions were relayed via the Wrexham-Rhos transmitting station). A network of relay stations extends television coverage as far as Colwyn Bay in the west and Bala in the south.

VHF television services from both BBC and ITV were discontinued in January 1985 as the 405-line TV system was switched off across the UK as a whole.

Moel-y-Parc's UHF channel allocation made it a "Group B" transmitter, but with the roll-out of the UK's first digital TV services in 1998, a "Group W" wideband aerial was needed. The site reverted to being a "Group B" transmitter at digital switchover (DSO). Technically, with the advent of the temporary MUXES 7 and 8 Moel Y Parc became a K group, and is due to remain so at its 700 MHz clearance. However most B group aerials will still work on all Moel's transmitted DTT channels (see graph). 
 
The site is currently administered by Arqiva.

Channels listed by frequency

Analogue television

28 January 1963 – 28 October 1965
The ITV 405-line television service commenced with Teledu Cymru on 28 January 1963.

One year later, Wales (West and North) Limited had collapsed financially, and the ITA awarded the franchise to provide the service from 27 January 1964 for the West and North Wales region to Television Wales and West, the holder of the franchise for the South Wales and West of England region.

28 October 1965 – 5 July 1969
BBC 405-line TV was added, obtaining its signal from an SHF link on the Great Orme which picked up the signal from Llanddona on Anglesey.

Until the mid-1960s, it had been common practice for BBC and ITV transmitters to be hosted from different masts. Moel-y-Parc had been engineered to take both services and be capable of the UHF transmission when they arrived. Additionally (and unusually) the BBC's VHF television transmissions were on Band III as were the ITA's transmissions. Having both services on the same mast meant that the region's viewers only needed one aerial.

This was the final BBC VHF television "main station" to be commissioned. The BBC published a technical report on the mast and its aerials.

5 July 1969 - 1973

1973 - 1 November 1982

1 November 1982 – 3 January 1985

3 January 1985 – 15 November 1998
405-line television was switched off across the UK and both Moel-y-Parc's VHF transmitters ceased operation after 20 and 22 years of service for the BBC and ITV respectively.

Analogue and digital television

15 November 1998 – 28 October 2009

28 October 2009 – 25 November 2009

Digital television

25 November 2009 – 14 November 2012
As part of the digital switchover, analogue BBC2 Wales ceased transmission on 28 October 2009, followed by analogue BBC1 Wales, HTV Wales and S4C on 25 November 2009. They were replaced by higher powered digital transmissions.

14 November 2012 – 26 February 2019
In coordination with changes to transmission frequencies elsewhere in the UK arising from the clearance of the 800 MHz band for 4G mobile phone use, Moel-y-Parc's "Digital 3&4" multiplex was moved from channel 49+ to channel 39+.

26 April 2017

The transmission of the local television "LOC1" multiplex (DVB-t system with QPSK modulation) from Moel-y-Parc on UHF channel 56 with ERP of 2 kW commenced.

Although a licence had been issued in January 2014 to Bay TV Clwyd (subsequent to the launch of Bay TV Liverpool) to start a local television service for North East Wales from studios in Mold, it was not until 26 April 2017 that the successor company Made TV which had taken over the operations of bankrupt Bay TV, was able to launch the local television "LOC1" multiplex to carry the "Made in North Wales TV" service.

Local reaction to the launch was highly critical because production of programing was no longer to be in Mold within the licensed service area, but at the studios of "Made in Liverpool" in Toxteth, Liverpool.

27 February 2019 – 11 August 2020
In coordination with changes to transmission frequencies elsewhere in the UK arising from the clearance of the 700 MHz band for 5G mobile phone use, the following changes were implemented.  The local TV "LOC1" multiplex (carrying North Wales TV) was moved from UHF channel 56 to UHF channel 27, and the transmission ERP increased from 2 kW to 3 kW. The "Arqiva A" multiplex was moved from UHF channel 52 to UHF channel 36. The national "COM7" multiplex was moved from UHF channel 32 to UHF channel 55 and the transmission ERP increased from 14 kW to 16 kW.

With the changes on 27 February 2009, the corresponding frequency of each public service multiplex transmitted from Storeton was also changed to the same as that transmitted from Moel-y-Parc, thereby making each site a constituent part of a single-frequency network (SFN), resulting in a significant improvement in reception quality at locations where signals were being received from both sites but where neither was consistently adequate.

June 30, 2020

The transmission of the national "COM8" multiplex from Moel-y-Parc on UHF channel 34 ceased.

A commercial decision had been taken by Arqiva to discontinue transmission of the national "COM8" multiplex having failed to obtain a response from Ofcom concerning the duration of the future availability of the transmission frequencies used.

12 August 2020 - present
In coordination with changes to transmission frequencies elsewhere in the UK arising from the clearance of the 700 MHz band for 5G mobile phone use, Moel-y-Parc's "SDN" multiplex was moved from UHF channel 51 to UHF channel 33.

Analogue radio (FM VHF)

Digital radio (DAB)

On air date March 2013 
† Relay of Winter Hill

Reception area
In terms of land area and population, Moel-y-Parc delivers a receivable signal to a greater area, and a greater number of potential viewers, in North West England than in its intended coverage area of north-east Wales. Transmissions can be received using standard aerials in most of Merseyside, parts of Greater Manchester, parts of Lancashire as far north as Blackpool, and Wales-facing coastal areas of Cumbria and the Isle of Man. In the past, some English viewers have erected a second aerial for Moel-y-Parc in order to receive a slightly increased choice of viewing, although this practice has declined with the introduction of satellite television and the reduction in schedule variations between different ITV regions. Liverpool is located directly between the Winter Hill transmitter and Moel-y-Parc. Many homes across Merseyside county obtain an adequate signal through their TV aerial from Moel-y-Parc, even though the aerial is pointing at Winter Hill.  With the advent of digital television, this has resulted in television tuners detecting the multiplexes broadcast from Moel-y-Parc on the lower frequencies before those on the higher frequencies from Winter Hill during the scanning/retune operation, and without viewer intervention where software allows region selection or by manual re-ordering, placing the Welsh variants on the allocated Freeview EPG logical channel number entries.

The Welsh variations of services (BBC One Wales, BBC Two Wales, ITV Wales) transmitted from Moel-y-Parc contend with the North West variations of services (BBC One North West, BBC Two, ITV Granada) transmitted from Winter Hill, which can also be received in the Wrexham area and along the North Wales coast.

Until 28 January 1963 and the start of transmissions of Teledu Cymru/WWN (Wales West and North Television) on VHF channel 11 from Moel-y-Parc, the only official ITV providers for North East Wales were Granada Television (in Manchester) during the week and ABC Television at the weekend, both transmitted on VHF channel 9 from Winter Hill. Pressure for a distinctly Welsh TV station was one of the driving forces behind the construction of the Moel-y-Parc mast, along with the need to deliver television to the more mountainous interior of Wales, which was out of range of English transmitters.

As late as the 1980s, Granada Television continued to claim parts of North Wales as within its editorial coverage area, in competition with HTV Cymru Wales, who had been awarded the franchise for the whole of Wales since 1968. However, after a series of mergers in the 1990s following deregulation of commercial television, Granada and HTV Cymru Wales were subsumed into ITV plc, and thus there is no longer commercial competition between the two services. ITV Granada no longer provides any regional news, weather or local interest programmes related to North Wales. Whereas in times past the official ITV Regions map distinctly showed areas of North Wales as being part of the ITV Granada region, the only known publicly accessible official ITV map showing the borders of the ITV regions, the ITV Regional Advertising map, shows the boundary between ITV Granada and ITV Wales as lying on the national boundary line between England and Wales.

For many homes across North East and Mid Wales, it is also possible to receive the ITV Central (West) service from The Wrekin Transmitter. Unlike what was once the case for ITV Granada, these areas were never included in ITV Central's editorial coverage area for regional news, weather, or local interest programmes.

Reception difficulties
The Moel-y-Parc transmitter service area has always suffered from out of area reception from a number of adjacent transmitters or relays with overlapping coverage, or intermittent extended coverage due to atmospheric conditions, namely the transmissions from Llanddona, Storeton, Fenton, Sutton Coldfield and The Wrekin B.

During the time of analogue television, parts of Greater Manchester were subject at times to co-channel interference from Moel-y-Parc because the Saddleworth relay of Winter Hill transmitted on the same frequencies, UHF channels 42, 45, 49 and 52, although mitigated by transmissions from Moel-y-Parc being horizontally polarized and those from Saddleworth being vertically polarized.

Parts of the North East Wales coast where reception of Moel-y-Parc is obscured by the Clwyd Hills were served by relays of Moel-y-Parc at Bagillt, Flint, and Holywell.  Following analog to digital television switchover, these relays were closed, and the Welsh regional variants of multiplexes PSB1, PSB2, and PSB3 are now broadcast to this area from Storeton, with Storeton being line-fed these multiplexes by fibre optic cable.

There are nineteen other Moel-y-Parc relays broadcasting the Welsh regional variants of multiplexes PSB1, PSB2, and PSB3 received off-air from Moel-y-Parc.

Digital switchover problems
By December 2009, more than 6,000 complaints concerning interference from the Moel-y-Parc television transmitter had been received following the changeover from analog to digital television in the Ofcom designated "Granada" (viz. North West England) region. Many residents in Wirral and west Cheshire found the Welsh variants of television services with regional content, namely BBC One Wales and BBC Two Wales from BBC Wales and ITV Wales on the Freeview logical channel numbers displayed at the start of the EPG listing, instead of BBC One North West, BBC Two, and ITV Granada. Digital UK, the organisation responsible for the switchover, responded by telling consumers to retune their systems manually.  This problem arises because the multiplexes transmitted from Moel-y-Parc with the Welsh regional content are on lower frequencies than those of the multiplexes transmitted from Winter Hill with the North West regional content.  Thus when the TV tuner scans the UHF spectrum searching each UHF channel for the presence of a signal for a DVB multiplex, it finds the Welsh variants first and without the software offering the viewer a choice of which regional variant to use, it uses the first transmitter group of multiplexes detected to populate the EPG Freeview LCN entries, and places any alternatives or duplicates on LCNs beginning at 700, regardless of the viewer's preferred regional content or signal quality.

See also
 Wales West and North Television
 List of tallest buildings and structures in Great Britain

References

External links
 The Transmission Gallery: photographs, information and coverage maps
Pictures and info of Moel Y Parc including co-receivable transmitters
Moel-y-Parc Transmitter at thebigtower.com

Buildings and structures in Flintshire
Transmitter sites in Wales
Radio masts and towers in Europe